Walter S. Plock (July 2, 1869 – April 28, 1900) was an American professional baseball player, who appeared in two games for the 1891 Philadelphia Phillies.  In six at bats, he collected two hits, and scored two runs.  In addition to his short stint as a Major League Baseball player, he played in six minor league seasons.  Plock was born in Philadelphia, Pennsylvania, and died at the age of 30 in Richmond, Virginia of a bridge accident.  He is interred in his hometown of Philadelphia in Mount Peace Cemetery.

References

External links

1869 births
1900 deaths
Major League Baseball center fielders
Baseball players from Philadelphia
Philadelphia Phillies players
Philadelphia Giants (Middle States League) players
New Orleans Pelicans (baseball) players
Binghamton Bingoes players
York White Roses players
Indianapolis Hoosiers (minor league) players
Lynchburg Hill Climbers players
19th-century baseball players
Accidental deaths in Virginia
Cobleskill Giants players